The 2017 Copa Libertadores group stage was played from 7 March to 25 May 2017. A total of 32 teams competed in the group stage to decide the 16 places in the final stages of the 2017 Copa Libertadores.

Draw
The draw for the group stage was held on 21 December 2016, 20:00 PYST (UTC−3), at the CONMEBOL Convention Centre in Luque, Paraguay.

Teams were seeded by their CONMEBOL ranking of the Copa Libertadores (shown in parentheses), taking into account of the following three factors:
Performance in the last 10 years, taking into account Copa Libertadores results in the period 2007–2016
Historical coefficient, taking into account Copa Libertadores results in the period 1960–2006
Local tournament champion, with bonus points awarded to domestic league champions of the last 10 years
For the group stage, the 32 teams were drawn into eight groups (Groups 1–8) of four containing a team from each of the four pots. Teams from the same association could not be drawn into the same group, excluding the winners of the third stage, which were allocated to Pot 4 and whose identity was not known at the time of the draw, and could be drawn into the same group with another team from the same association.

Notes

The following were the four winners of the third stage of qualifying which joined the 28 direct entrants in the group stage.

Format

In the group stage, each group was played on a home-and-away round-robin basis. The teams were ranked according to points (3 points for a win, 1 point for a draw, and 0 points for a loss). If tied on points, the following criteria would be used to determine the ranking: 1. Goal difference; 2. Goals scored; 3. Away goals scored; 4. CONMEBOL ranking (Regulations Article 5.1).

The winners and runners-up of each group advanced to the round of 16 of the knockout stages. The third-placed teams of each group entered the Copa Sudamericana second stage.

Groups
The fixture list was determined by the draw as follows:
Round 1: Team 3 vs. Team 1, Team 4 vs. Team 2
Round 2: Team 1 vs. Team 4, Team 2 vs. Team 3
Round 3: Team 2 vs. Team 1, Team 3 vs. Team 4
Round 4: Team 1 vs. Team 2, Team 4 vs. Team 3
Round 5: Team 4 vs. Team 1, Team 3 vs. Team 2
Round 6: Team 1 vs. Team 3, Team 2 vs. Team 4

The matches were played on 7–9, 14–16 March, 11–13, 18–20 April, 25–27 April, 2–4, 10, 16–18 and 23–25 May 2017.

Group 1

Group 2

Group 3

Group 4

Group 5

Group 6

Group 7

Group 8

Notes

References

External links
 
CONMEBOL Libertadores Bridgestone 2017, CONMEBOL.com 

2
March 2017 sports events in South America
April 2017 sports events in South America
May 2017 sports events in South America